Sotigui Kouyaté (19 July 1936 – 17 April 2010) was one of the first Malian, Burkinabé actors. He was the father of film director Dani Kouyaté, of the storyteller Hassane Kassi Kouyaté and of the actor Mabô Kouyaté
and was a member of the Mandinka ethnic group.

Members of Kouyaté's lineage or clan have served as griots for the Keita dynasty since at least the 13th century. The Kouyatés guard customs, and their knowledge is authoritative among Mandinkas. Keitas have to provide amenities to Kouyatés, who in turn should not hesitate to ask for Keita help. The word Kouyaté translates as "there is a secret between you and me".

Biography

Sotigui Kouyaté was born in Mali to Guinean parents and is Burkinabé by adoption. When he was a child, he enjoyed koteba performances. He once played on the Burkina Faso national football team. Kouyaté began his theatre career in 1966, when he appeared as adviser to the king in a historical play produced by his friend Boubacar Dicko. That year, he founded a theatre company with 25 people and soon wrote his first play, The Crocodile’s Lament.

Kouyaté has worked with Peter Brook on his theater and film projects since they became associated with one another while working on Brook's adaptation of the Indian epic The Mahabharata in 1983. Kouyaté has appeared in over two dozen films, most recently as Jacob in Genesis and Alioune in Little Senegal. Kouyaté played the central role of Djeliba Kouyaté in Dani Kouyaté's 1995 film Keïta! l'Héritage du griot, the character being imagined as an old dying man by his son, though portrayed as more forceful than that. The elder Kouyaté also plays instruments, simple melodies on the kora or flute.

From 1990 to 1996 Kouyaté toured the United States and Europe as part of La Voix du Griot ("Voice of the Griot"), a storytelling theater show he founded. When asked in an October 2001 interview whether he felt he was carrying a message from Africa, he replied:

In 2009, Kouyaté won a Silver Bear at the Berlinale Filmfestival for his acting. He played the main male character in Rachid Bouchareb's drama London River, about the 2005 London bombings. On 17 April 2010, he died in Paris.

Sotigui Kouyate: 
A Modern Griot

Director: Mahamat-Saleh Haroun
From: Chad/France
Year: 1996 Minutes:58
Language: French with English subtitles
Genre: Documentary
Official selection, African Diaspora Film Festival 2007

When casting The Mahabharata, Peter Brook's assistant scoured through film studios in search of an actor to take on one of the lead roles, Bhishma the sage. “I saw one shot of a tree and a man as tall and slender as this tree, with an extraordinary presence and quality. It was Sotigui,” recalls Brook in this documentary about the actor. Born in 1936 in Bamako (Mali), Kouyaté belongs to an illustrious family of griots–masters of words who are at once genealogists, historians, masters of ceremonies, advisers, mediators, singers and musicians. He has handed down all these talents, as a composer, dancer, actor and father, to his own children and a multitude of “spiritual children” dispersed across the world, for whom he is a precious guide. Filling each of his roles with profound dignity, he has appeared in some 60 films, including Sia The Dream of the Python directed by his son Dany Kouyate and Names Live Nowhere in which he follows African immigrants in Belgium and tells their story only as a griot could.

Through testimonies by Peter Brook, Jean-Claude Carriere, Jean-Pierre Guigane and Sotigui Kouyate himself, Sotigui Kouyate: a Modern Griot dresses the portrait of one of Africa's greatest actor now based in Paris. From Africa to Europe, the film unveils the multiple facets of Sotigui Kouyate, actor, musician and modern griot. Winner ACCT award at the Amiens Film Festival, 1996.

"Despite years away from home and a career spanning many cultures, Malian actor and griot Sotigui Kouyaté has not strayed from his foremost mission: to break ignorance of Africa's living traditions and spark encounters across continents" - Cynthia Guttman, UNESCO Courier.

References

Further reading

1936 births
2010 deaths
Burkinabé male film actors
Burkinabé footballers
Burkina Faso international footballers
People from Bamako
Silver Bear for Best Actor winners
20th-century Burkinabé male actors
21st-century Burkinabé male actors
Association footballers not categorized by position